Yacuma may refer to:
 Yacuma River - River in Bolivia
 Yacuma Province - Bolivia province
 Yakuma - Mountain peak in Bolivia near La Paz